Irina Fedotova is a Russian model, artist and fashion designer. She won the Gold Thimble, first prize award, at the 2012 graduate fashion show at Parsons Paris, where she earned a Bachelors of Fine Art degree in fashion design. Past winners of the award include Marc Jacobs, and Peter Som. Following which Fedotova worked as a designer for French luxury fashion brand Balmain. She has modelled for brands such as Dolce & Gabbana, La Perla and Missoni. Ottavio Missoni called Fedotova the "Russian Gisele", and she was chosen by the founders of Dolce & Gabbana as their main fitting model.

In April 2021, Fedotova made front page news in the United Kingdom when she was banned by Westminster Magistrates' Court from all clubs and bars in England and Wales for two years, after a physical altercation with two police officers. In August 2021, she challenged the judgment and subsequently won a Crown Court appeal case to have the national ban lifted, stating that she had "acted in self-defence."

References

External links 
 Irina Fedotova official website
 Irina Fedotova on Instagram

Russian women artists
Russian fashion designers
Russian women fashion designers
Russian artists
Parsons School of Design alumni
Year of birth missing (living people)
Living people